Little Bighorn Battlefield National Monument preserves the site of the June 25 and 26, 1876, Battle of the Little Bighorn, near Crow Agency, Montana, in the United States. It also serves as a memorial to those who fought in the battle: George Armstrong Custer's 7th Cavalry and a combined Lakota-Northern Cheyenne and Arapaho force. Custer National Cemetery, on the battlefield, is part of the national monument. The site of a related military action led by Marcus Reno and Frederick Benteen is also part of the national monument, but is about 3 miles (4.83 km) southeast of the Little Bighorn battlefield.

History of site
 25 and 26 June 1876: Battle of the Little Bighorn
 1877: Custer, who had been buried there, was reinterred in West Point Cemetery.
 29 January 1879: The Secretary of War first preserved the site as a U.S. National Cemetery, to protect graves of the 7th Cavalry troopers buried there.
 7 December 1886: The site was proclaimed National Cemetery of Custer's Battlefield Reservation to include burials of other campaigns and wars. The name has been shortened to "Custer National Cemetery."
 5 November 1887: Battle of Crow Agency, three miles north of Custer battlefield
 14 April 1926: Reno-Benteen Battlefield was added
 1 July 1940: The site was transferred from the United States Department of War to the National Park Service
 22 March 1946: The site was redesignated "Custer Battlefield National Monument."
 15 October 1966: The site was listed on the National Register of Historic Places.
 1976, The American Indian Movement (AIM) protested the centennial commemoration of the site, arguing that the site revered Custer and the Battle of Little Big Horn as a part of a heroic saga of American history and expansion into the American West while those who revered it had been truly "celebrating an act of genocide."
 11 August 1983: A wildfire destroyed dense thorn scrub which over the years had seeded itself about and covered the site. This allowed archaeologists access to the site.
 1984, 1985: Archaeological digging on site.
 10 December 1991: The site was renamed Little Bighorn Battlefield National Monument by a law signed by President George H. W. Bush.

Memorials

The first memorial on the site was assembled by Captain George K. Sanderson and the 11th Infantry. They buried soldiers' bodies where they were found and removed animal bones. In his official report dated April 7, 1879, Sanderson wrote:

I accordingly built a mound out of cord wood filled in the center with all the horse bones I could find on the field. In the center of the mound I dug a grave and interred all the human bones that could be found, in all, parts of four or five different bodies. This grave was then built up with wood for four feet above ground. The mound is ten feet square and about eleven feet high; is built on the highest point immediately in rear of where Gen'l Custer's body was found ...

Lieutenant Charles F. Roe and the 2nd Cavalry built the granite memorial in July 1881 that stands today on the top of Last Stand Hill. They also reinterred soldiers' remains near the new memorial, but left stakes in the ground to mark where they had fallen. In 1890 these stakes were replaced with marble markers.

The bill that changed the name of the national monument also called for an "Indian Memorial" to be built near Last Stand Hill.

Markers honoring the Indians who fought at Little Big Horn, including Crazy Horse, have been added to those of the U.S. troops. On Memorial Day, 1999, the first of five red granite markers denoting where warriors fell during the battle were placed on the battlefield for Cheyenne warriors Lame White Man and Noisy Walking.

The Indian Memorial (2001-2003) was designed by John R. Collins and Alison J. Towers, who won a national competition in 1997 set out by Congress. Constructed of sandstone, it takes the form of a circular low wall that is topped with sculptor Colleen Cutschall (Oglala and Sicangu)’s bronze figure procession Spirit Warriors. Then-Colorado Senator Ben Nighthorse Campbell spoke at the dedication of the monument:  “[...] Come back sometime early in the morning after a rain when the fog is laying in the valleys and things are quiet and the moon is waning, and perhaps all you can hear is the sounds of nature. If you’re here by yourself during that time, I know you’ll feel like Indian people feel when they’re here.” Nighthorse Campbell is descended from one of the Cheyenne leaders who fought General Custer.

The warriors' red speckled granite memorial markers dot the ravines and hillsides, just as do the white marble markers representing where soldiers fell. Since then, markers have been added for the Sans Arc Lakota warrior Long Road and the Minniconjou Lakota Dog's Back Bone.

On June 25, 2003, an "unknown Lakota warrior marker" was placed on Wooden Leg Hill, east of Last Stand Hill to honor a warrior who was killed during the battle, as witnessed and reported by the Northern Cheyenne warrior Wooden Leg.

The battlefield is the final resting place of the western historian and author Stanley Vestal, a professor at the University of Oklahoma.

Gallery

See also
 List of military installations in Montana
 List of national monuments of the United States

References

 The National Parks: Index 2001-2003. Washington: U.S. Department of the Interior.

External links

 Official NPS website: Little Bighorn Battlefield National Monument
 Friends of the Little Bighorn Battlefield
 About the 1983 wildfire
 About the 1984 archaeology
 History of the burials and reburials of the Custer dead.
 Custer National Cemetery register
 Find A Grave: Custer National Cemetery
 How the Battle of Little Bighorn Was Won, from the Indians' point of view
"Writings of Black Elk", broadcast from Little Bighorn Battlefield National Monument from C-SPAN's American Writers

Battlefields of the wars between the United States and Native Americans
1879 establishments in Montana Territory
Protected areas of Big Horn County, Montana
National Park Service National Monuments in Montana
Great Sioux War of 1876
Federal lands in Montana
Archaeological sites in Montana
Protected areas established in 1879
Conflict sites on the National Register of Historic Places in Montana
Battle of the Little Bighorn
National Register of Historic Places in Big Horn County, Montana